Emmetia angusticollella is a moth of the  family Tischeriidae. It is found in most of Europe.

The larvae feed on Rosa species.

References

External links
Larval Stage info
bladmineerders.nl 

Tischeriidae
Moths of Japan
Moths of Europe
Moths of Asia